The El Paso Independent School District (or EPISD) is the largest school district serving El Paso, Texas (USA).  Originally organized in 1883, it is currently the largest district in the Texas Education Agency's Educational Service Center (ESC) Region 19, as well as the largest district within the city of El Paso and El Paso County.  The EPISD also provides public education to the children of U.S. Army soldiers stationed at Fort Bliss. The district headquarters are located in El Paso.

In 2009, the school district was rated "academically acceptable" by the Texas Education Agency.

Board of Trustees
The EPISD is managed by a school board (called the Board of Trustees) composed of seven publicly elected school board trustees and a single superintendent.  Each trustee represents one of the seven districts in the EPISD.

Statistics
 More than 63,000 students.
 92 campuses.
 With more than 9,000 employees, it is the largest employer in El Paso.
 Estimated annual operating budget is $403-million.
 Twelfth largest school district in Texas (as of 2016-2017)
 57th largest school district in the United States.

History
 In 1882, El Paso Independent School District was established, with Joseph Magoffin, Samuel Freudenthal and Edward Pew as the founding trustees and Calvin W. Esterly as the first superintendent.
 In 1889, the first kindergarten ever established in Texas was established at Alamo Elementary School in the EPISD.
 In 1916, the first high school in the EPISD was established: El Paso High School.
 In 1927, Bowie High School was established to reduce overcrowding at El Paso High School by converting a grammar school built in 1923 in Central El Paso.
 In 1930, Austin High School was established as the third high school in the EPISD, admitting its first students following its construction in 1929.
In 1949, Jefferson High School was established in Central El Paso
 In 1955, Burges High School was established in East El Paso.
 In 1959, Irvin High School was established in Northeast El Paso.
 In 1961, Andress High School was established in Northeast El Paso.
 In 1962, Coronado High School was established in Northwest El Paso.
 In 1993, Franklin High School was established in Northwest El Paso.
 In 1999, the district's oldest operating school, Alamo Elementary School, celebrated its 100th birthday.
 In 2000, Chapin High School was established in Northeast El Paso.
 In 2011, the district's superintendent Lorenzo Garcia was arrested by the FBI. He later pleaded guilty to conspiracy to commit mail fraud- he stole money from the district and also had high school principals illegally kick students out of school and illegally change 10th graders to being listed as members of other grades, in order to cheat on the state's standardized tests.
 In 2012, the district's board of trustees were stripped of power by the Texas Education Agency, and oversight of the district was given to a TEA-appointed board of managers, because the trustees failed to stop Garcia's wrongdoing and failed to fire his co-conspirators after he was arrested.

List of schools

High schools
Located in Central El Paso
Austin High School
Located in East El Paso
Burges High School
Located in Northeast El Paso
Andress High School
Chapin High School
Irvin High School
Transmountain Early College High School
Located in South Central El Paso
Bowie High School
Jefferson High School
Silva Health Magnet High School
2003, 2011, 2017 National Blue Ribbon School
Located in West El Paso
Coronado High School
Franklin High School
Located in West Central El Paso
El Paso High School

Middle schools
Located in Central El Paso
 Armendariz Middle School
 Bassett Middle School
 Ross Middle School
Located in East El Paso
 MacArthur Elementary-Intermediate School
Located in Northeast El Paso
 Canyon Hills Middle School
 Charles Middle School
 Magoffin Middle School
 Richardson Middle School
 Terrace Hills Middle School
Located in South Central El Paso
 Guillen Middle School
 Henderson Middle School
Located in West El Paso
 Brown Middle School
 Haskins Elementary-Intermediate School
 Hornedo Middle School
 Morehead Middle School
Located in West Central El Paso
 Wiggs Middle School

Elementary schools
Located in Central El Paso
 Clendenin Elementary School
 Coldwell Elementary School
 Crockett Elementary School
1985-86 National Blue Ribbon School
 Hillside Elementary School
2000-01 National Blue Ribbon School
 Hughey Elementary School
 Moreno Elementary School
 Rusk Elementary School
 Travis Elementary School
Located in East El Paso
 Cielo Vista Elementary School
Located on Fort Bliss
 Bliss Elementary School
 Logan Elementary School
 Milam Elementary School
 Powell Elementary School
Located in Northeast El Paso
 Barron Elementary School
 Collins Elementary School
 Moye Elementary School
 Newman Elementary School
 Nixon Elementary School
 Park Elementary School
 Stanton Elementary School
 Sunrise Mountain Elementary School (formerly Lee Elementary School; renamed in 2020)
 Tom Lea Elementary School 
 Torres Elementary School
 Whitaker Elementary School
Located in West El Paso
 Green Elementary School
 Guerrero Elementary School
 Herrera Elementary School
 Johnson Elementary School
 Kohlberg Elementary School
 Lundy Elementary School
 Polk Elementary School
 Putnam Elementary School
 Rivera Elementary School
 Tippin Elementary School
 Western Hills Elementary School
 White Elementary School
Located in South Central El Paso
 Aoy Elementary School
 Clardy Elementary School
 Cooley Elementary School
 Douglass Elementary School
 Hart Elementary School
 Hawkins Elementary School
 Zavala Elementary School
Located in West Central El Paso
 Lamar Elementary School
 Mesita Elementary School

Special campuses
 College Career and Technology Academy (formerly Sunset High School and School Age Parent Center)
Delta Academy (alternative campus for juvenile detention center inmates)
Occupational Center
Regional Day School For The Deaf
San Jacinto Adult Learning Center
Telles Academy (disciplinary campus)
Young Women's STEAM Research & Preparatory Academy

Former campuses
 Alamo Elementary School (in South-Central El Paso; closed 2005; initially slated to reopen following renovations, but consolidated with Hart Elementary School in 2011)
 Alta Vista Elementary School (in East-Central El Paso; closed in 2019 due to declining enrollment)
 Beall Elementary School (in South-Central El Paso; closed in 2019 due to declining enrollment)
 Bond Elementary School (in West El Paso; consolidated with Roberts Elementary and Lincoln Middle to form Haskins Elementary-Intermediate School in 2021)
 Bonham Elementary School (in East El Paso; closed in 2021 and consolidated with MacArthur Elementary-Intermediate)
 Bradley Elementary School (in Northeast El Paso;closed in 2021, consolidated with Fannin Elementary School at Torres Elementary School)
 Burleson Elementary School (in South-Central El Paso; closed in 2019 due to declining enrollment)
 Burnet Elementary School (in Northeast El Paso; closed in 2018 due to declining enrollment)
 Crosby Elementary School (in Northeast El Paso; consolidated with Dowell Elementary and Schuster Elementary to form Duran Elementary in 2021)
 Dowell Elementary School (in Northeast El Paso; consolidated with Crosby Elementary and Schuster Elementary to form Duran Elementary in 2021)
 Dudley Elementary School (in West-Central El Paso; replaced by Mesita Elementary School in 1948)
 Fannin Elementary School (in Northeast El Paso;closed in 2021, consolidated with Bradley Elementary School at Torres Elementary School)
 Highland Elementary School (replaced by Moreno Elementary School in 2000) 
 Houston Elementary School (in East-Central El Paso; closed in 2010 due to declining enrollment, now the Houston School of Choice, a continuation high school)
 Jones Elementary School (in West-Central El Paso; closed and razed in 1972 along with the Smeltertown neighborhood it served and in which it was located)
 Lincoln Elementary School (in South-Central El Paso; moved and reconfigured to form Lincoln Middle School)
 Lincoln Middle School (in West El Paso; consolidated with Bond Elementary and Roberts Elementary to form Haskins Elementary-Intermediate School in 2021)
 Navarro Elementary School (in Ciudad Juarez since 1963 because it was located on land ceded to Mexico under the terms of the Chamizal Treaty. It is now part of the Autonomous University of Ciudad Juarez [UACJ]).
 Roberts Elementary School (in West El Paso; consolidated with Bond Elementary and Lincoln Middle in 2021 to form Haskins Elementary-Intermediate)
 Roosevelt Elementary School (in South-Central El Paso; closed in 2006, consolidated with Aoy Elementary School)
 San Jacinto Elementary School (closed in 1976, now San Jacinto Adult Learning Center)
 Schuster Elementary School (in Northeast El Paso;closed in 2019 due to declining enrollment)
 Vilas Elementary School (in West-Central El Paso; closed in 2016, now a satellite campus of Mesita Elementary School, Mesita Early Childhood Development Center at Vilas, which serves prekindergarten to first grade)

Dormant campuses
 Wainwright Elementary School (in Northeast El Paso; mothballed since 2005; currently used as a science resource center)

Administrative offices

Its current headquarters are in Downtown El Paso.

The district began leasing a property on the grounds of El Paso International Airport in 1963 to house its administrative headquarters. By the 2010s the City of El Paso desired the use of the property for airport expansion, but chose to defer the original 2014 expiration of the lease to at least December 31, 2019 so EPISD had time to find a new headquarters location. In 2021 the current EPISD headquarters opened. The district spent $3.2 million to buy the land and the building on it for the downtown headquarters.

Notable EPISD alumni

 F. Murray Abraham, an award-winning actor, is a graduate of El Paso High School.
 Alan Culpepper, a two-time Olympian (2000, 2004) and three-time US Cross-Country Champion, is a graduate of Coronado High School.
 Sam Donaldson, a famous television journalist, is a graduate of El Paso High School.
 Eddie Guerrero, a former professional wrestler for World Wrestling Entertainment (WWE)  who was WWE Champion, two-time WWE Intercontinental Champion and member of the WWE Hall of Fame, was a graduate of Jefferson High School.
 Emcee N.I.C.E.(Aulsondro "Novelist" Hamilton) is a Multi-Platinum musician, actor was a part of Lighter Shade of Brown the first Latin Rap group in the history. Produced iconic musicians such as Tupac, Nas, Aaron Hall & more. He is also associated with The 78th Academy Awards winning film Crash (2004 film) Soundtrack along with 7 more notable soundtracks and over 30 records recorded as a member of KansasCali. He attended Travis Elementary, Bassett Junior High School, Canyon Hills Junior High & Irvin High School before moving to Kansas 
 Shoshana Johnson, a famed Iraq War POW, is a graduate of Andress High School.
 Tom Lea, famed author and painter, was a graduate of El Paso High School.
 Tom Moore, a cartoonist best known for the "Archie" comic books series, is a 1946 graduate of Austin High School.
 John Moyer, the current bassist for the rock band Disturbed, is a graduate of Coronado High School .
 Sandra Day O'Connor, a former U.S. Supreme Court Associate Justice, is a graduate of Austin High School.
 John D. Olivas, a NASA astronaut, is a graduate of Burges High School.
 Lupe Ontiveros, a veteran actress, was a graduate of El Paso High School.
 Nolan Richardson, a nationally recognized basketball coach, graduated from Bowie High School. 
 Rubén Salazar, a noted Mexican-American journalist, was a graduate of El Paso High School.

Other notables who have attended EPISD schools
 Richard Ramirez, known as The Night Stalker, a serial killer who died of natural causes while awaiting execution in California, attended Jefferson High School but dropped out.
 Debbie Reynolds attended Houston and Crockett Elementary Schools before her family moved to California.
 Sharon Tate, actress and Manson Family murder victim, attended Irvin High School briefly in 1959 and 1960.

See also

List of school districts in Texas

References

External links

 

 
School districts in El Paso, Texas
Education in El Paso, Texas
School districts established in 1883